The African Youth Championship 1989 was contested through home and away matches. It also served as qualification for the 1989 FIFA World Youth Championship.

Teams
The following teams entered the tournament (and played at least one match):

Preliminary Round:
 
 
 
 
 
 

First round:

Preliminary round
Central Africa, Mauritania, Mauritius and Kenya withdrew: Gabon, Algeria, Madagascar and Lesotho advanced to the first round.

|}

First round
Madagascar, Somalia and Togo withdrew: Egypt, Ivory Coast and Lesotho advanced to the second round.

|}

Quarterfinals

|}

Semi-finals

|}

Final
Matches were played on 1 January in Bamako, Mali and 14 January in Ibadan, Nigeria.

|}

Second final match details:

Qualification to World Youth Championship
The two best performing teams qualified for the 1989 FIFA World Youth Championship.

External links
Results by RSSSF

Africa U-20 Cup of Nations
Youth
1989 in youth association football